Korea Tungsten Company FC is defunct South Korean semi-professional football club that was based Yeongwol, Gangwon. The club was officially founded in 1956, by the Korea Tungsten Company.

Korea Tungsten Company is rated as predecessor of POSCO, and Daehan Tungsten FC is predecessor of POSCO Atoms, too.

Honours

Domestic
Korean President's Cup
 Winner (2) : 1965, 1966
 Runner-up (1) : 1962
Korean National Football Championship
 Runner-up (2) : 1962, 1968

Asia
Asian Club Championship 1967 Semifinalist

References

Association football clubs established in 1956
S
S
1956 establishments in South Korea
1972 disestablishments in South Korea
Works association football clubs in South Korea